Arstanosaurus (meaning "Arstan lizard" after the Arstan well) is a genus of hadrosauroid dinosaur from the Santonian-Campanian-age Upper Cretaceous Bostobe Formation, Kazakhstan. It has had a confusing history, being considered both a hadrosaurid and a ceratopsid, or both at the same time (chimeric).

History
The genus was based on a partial left maxilla (holotype AAIZ 1/1 or IZ AN KSSR 1/1), with the lower end of a left femur (AAIZ 1/2) possibly referable. Both were found at Akkurgan-Boltyk near Qyzylorda. This is not much material for naming a new genus, and it was largely ignored until the mid-1990s, when the hypothesis that it was really a ceratopsid appeared. Shortly thereafter, a new revision appeared that showed that the characteristics listed as unusual for Arstanosaurus were really based on perspective, and that the maxilla was from an animal like Bactrosaurus, albeit indeterminate (a dubious name). The femur was uninformative. It was regarded as an indeterminate hadrosaurid in the most recent review.

Diagnostic hadrosauroid remains from the same area have in 2012 been named as Batyrosaurus.

A hadrosauroid from the Bayan Shireh Formation (informally called "Gadolosaurus") has at times been identified as Arstanosaurus, but is clearly a distinct genus.

Paleobiology
As a hadrosaurid, Arstanosaurus would have been a bipedal/quadrupedal herbivore, eating plants with sets of ever-replacing teeth stacked on each other.

See also

 Timeline of hadrosaur research

References

Late Cretaceous dinosaurs of Asia
Hadrosaurs
Fossil taxa described in 1982
Ornithischian genera